Senator Adams may refer to:

Alonzo W. Adams (1820–1887), California state senator
Alva B. Adams (1875–1941), United States Senator from Colorado from 1923 until 1924 and again from 1933 to 1941
Benjamin Adams (politician) (1764–1837), Massachusetts State Senate
Billy Adams (politician) (1861–1954), Colorado State Senate
Brock Adams (1927–2004), Washington State Senate
Charles Bayley Adams (1887–1961), President of the Vermont State State Senate
Charles Edward Adams (politician) (1867–1936), Minnesota State Senate
Charles Francis Adams Sr. (1807–1886), Massachusetts State State Senate
Charles H. Adams (New York politician) (1824–1902)
Daniel Adams (physician) (1773–1864), Massachusetts State Senate
Eric Adams (politician) (born 1960), New York State Senate
George E. Adams (1840–1917), Illinois State Senate
George H. Adams (1851–1911), President of the New Hampshire State Senate
Greg L. Adams (born 1952)
Henry Adams (Wisconsin politician) (1811–1871), Wisconsin State State Senate
Isaac Adams (inventor) (1802–1883), Massachusetts State Senate
J. Stuart Adams, Utah State State Senate
James Hopkins Adams (1812–1861), South Carolina State Senate
John Q. Adams (Wisconsin politician) (1816–1895), Wisconsin State State Senate
John Quincy Adams (1767–1848), Massachusetts
John Turvill Adams (1805–1882), Connecticut State Senate
John Adams (Wisconsin politician, born 1819) (1819–1908), Wisconsin State State Senate
John Adams Sr. (Nebraska politician) (1876–1962), Nebraska Legislature
John Adams Jr. (Nebraska politician) (1906–1999), Nebraska Legislature
Julie Raque Adams (born 1969), Kentucky State Senate
Levi Adams (1762–1831), New York State Senate
Platt Adams (politician) (1792–1887), New York State Senate
Robert H. Adams (1792–1830), briefly a member of the United States State Senate for Mississippi
Robert Adams Jr. (1849–1906), Pennsylvania State Senate
Samuel Adams (Arkansas politician) (1805–1850), Arkansas State Senate
Samuel Adams (1722–1803), Massachusetts State Senate
Sebastian C. Adams (1825–1898), Oregon State Senate
Stephen Adams (politician) (1807–1857), United States Senator from Mississippi
Thomas Burton Adams Jr. (1917–2006), Florida State Senate from 1956 to 1960
Thurman Adams Jr. (1928–2009), Delaware State Senate
William E. Adams (New York politician) (1922–1983), New York State Senate

See also
John H. Addams (1822–1881), Illinois State Senate